Mourad Zelfani (born 11 December 1962) is a Tunisian wrestler. He competed in the men's freestyle 57 kg at the 1988 Summer Olympics.

References

External links
 

1962 births
Living people
Tunisian male sport wrestlers
Olympic wrestlers of Tunisia
Wrestlers at the 1988 Summer Olympics
Place of birth missing (living people)
20th-century Tunisian people